Davida Brittany Williams (born September 5, 1986) is an American actress, director, and producer. She is best known for her roles as Claire Miller in Lizzie McGuire and Lauren in Raise Your Voice. She is the daughter of the late David Williams and the older sister of Dana Williams (singer).

Early life
Williams grew up in Los Angeles, mostly around the San Fernando Valley. She began auditioning at age 8 and attended Louisville High School, an all girls Catholic high school in Woodland Hills.

Williams went on to briefly attend Mount St. Mary's but dropped out to move to New York City, where she worked as a junior agent at Ford Models. It was during this time she wanted to take a break from acting.

She is of mixed African-American and Italian descent.

Career 
Williams was a former member of R&B group TG4 
Tom Gurl Four

Williams has appeared in a wide variety of television series including The Fresh Prince of Bel-Air, "Hangin' With Mr. Cooper" and Quintuplets. In 2001 she was cast in the Disney Channel original series Lizzie McGuire. She was also the youngest person featured in Kevin Aucoin's makeup book Face Forward alongside Sharon Stone and Christy Turlington. Davida Williams co-starred with Hilary Duff in Lizzie McGuire. They were later reunited for Raise Your Voice. Williams then went on to co-star in the series pilot for Jonas starring The Jonas Brothers.

It was announced in 2008 that Williams would be joining the cast of As the World Turns as Jade Taylor, Williams made her debut on ATWT on December 12, 2008, and continued on the show for about a year thereafter. She then went on to guest star on Revenge on ABC, and 90210, and starred in the film Teenage Bank Heist for Lifetime.

She appeared in the film Dream Girl, starring Margaret Qualley from HBO's The Leftovers and Meredith Hagner of TBS' Search Party. She is also recurring on the series Foursome starring influencer Logan Paul for AwesomenessTV and YouTube Red. In 2017, she could also be seen as a guest star on the CBS series based on the film Training Day, starring Bill Paxton. She will play Kelly Price. She has also guest-starred on Freeform's Baby Daddy as the character Adrienne opposite Tahj Mowry. She has also guest-starred on Disney Channel's Stuck in the Middle. She recurred on the Hulu show CASUAL.

Filmography
Days of our Lives (1992) 
Hangin' with Mr. Cooper (1993)
Younger and Younger (1993)
The Sinbad Show (1993)
Me and the Boys (1994)
Happily Ever After: Fairy Tales for Every Child (1995)
Sweet Justice (1995)
The Fresh Prince of Bel-Air (1996)
Sister, Sister (1996)
Cybill (1997)
Star Trek: Deep Space Nine (1997)
Cry Baby Lane (2000)
Do Over (2002)
Degrassi: The Next Generation (2002–2003)
Lizzie McGuire (2001–2003)
Triple Play (2004)
The Tracy Morgan Show (2004)
Raise Your Voice (2004)
Quintuplets (2004)
Nick Cannon Presents: Short Circuitz (2007)
American High School (2008)
As the World Turns (2008–2009)
Dream Girl (2016)
Stuck in the Middle (2017)
Baby Daddy (2017)
Training Day (2017)
Casual (2017)
 Teenage Bank Heist 
Useless Humans (2020)
'' Game, Set, Love (2022)

References

External links

1986 births
African-American actresses
American child actresses
American television actresses
Living people
Singers from Los Angeles
American people of Italian descent
Actresses from Los Angeles
21st-century American singers
21st-century American actresses
20th-century African-American women singers
21st-century African-American women
21st-century African-American musicians